The Las Vegas Flash were an inline hockey team which existed for one season in 1994. The Flash were a part of Roller Hockey International. The team's home games were played at the Thomas & Mack Center.

The franchise was previously known as:
Utah Rollerbees (1993) - The team played in the Salt Palace II in Salt Lake City. The franchise was replaced by the Utah Sun Dogs (1997–99).

The franchise was replaced by:
Las Vegas Coyotes (1999).

Leading scorers
1994: Rich Chernomaz (24 goals, 30 assists)

Team records
Most goals: Rich Chernomaz, 24
Most goals, season: Rich Chernomaz, 24 (1994)
Most assists: Rich Chernomaz, 30
Most assists, season: Rich Chernomaz, 30 (1994)
Most points: Rich Chernomaz, 54
Most points, season: Rich Chernomaz, 54 (1994)
Most penalty minutes: Kevin Quinn, 83
Most penalty minutes, season: Kevin Quinn, 83 (1994)
Most games played: Ross Harris, 22

Season-by-season record

External links 
hockeydb.com RHI portal
RHI Stats

 
Roller Hockey International teams
Sports teams in Las Vegas
1994 establishments in Nevada
1994 disestablishments in Nevada
Sports clubs established in 1994
Sports clubs disestablished in 1994